Autoroute may refer to the following:

 Controlled-access highway, particularly in French-speaking countries
 Routing (electronic design automation), when routes to wires in a design are automatically assigned
 Microsoft AutoRoute, European name for Microsoft Streets & Trips, which helps plan trips by automobile

See also 
 Autoroutes of France
 Autoroutes of Quebec
 Autoroutes of Morocco